903 Nealley is a minor planet orbiting the Sun. The semi-major axis of the orbit of 903 Nealley lies just inside the Hecuba gap, located at 3.27 AU.

References

External links 
 Lightcurve plot of 903 Nealley, Palmer Divide Observatory, B. D. Warner (2011)
 Asteroid Lightcurve Database (LCDB), query form (info )
 Dictionary of Minor Planet Names, Google books
 Asteroids and comets rotation curves, CdR – Observatoire de Genève, Raoul Behrend
 Discovery Circumstances: Numbered Minor Planets (1)-(5000) – Minor Planet Center
 
 

000903
Discoveries by Johann Palisa
Named minor planets
19180913